Tax courts are courts of limited jurisdiction that deal with tax issues. 

Notable examples include:
United States Tax Court, a United States federal court
List of Judges of the United States Tax Court
Uniformity and jurisdiction in U.S. federal court tax decisions
State court (United States)
Oregon Tax Court of the Oregon Judicial Department
Hawaii Tax Appeal Court of the Hawai'i State Judiciary
Indiana Tax Court 
Massachusetts Appellate Tax Board
Minnesota Tax Court
New Jersey Tax Court
Tax Court of Canada
Tax Court of Canada Act
EFTA Court
Philippine Court of Tax Appeals

Courts by type
Former disambiguation pages converted to set index articles